was a Japanese actress who appeared in more than 100 films between 1950 and 1994. 

A graduate of Takarazuka Girl's Opera School, Otowa was first signed to Daiei studios, before becoming a freelance actress by the early 1950s. After starring in Kaneto Shindo's Story of a Beloved Wife, she became the director's mistress and appeared in nearly all of his following films. She finally married him in 1977, after his previous wife divorced him. Although closely associated with Shindo's films, with Children of Hiroshima, The Naked Island and Onibaba being among the most well-known, Otowa also worked for noted directors such as Kenji Mizoguchi, Mikio Naruse, Heinosuke Gosho, Keisuke Kinoshita and Nagisa Ōshima. Devoted to her profession, she frequently wrote and lectured on the art of film acting.

In 1995, she was posthumously awarded as best actress in a supporting role at the 19th Japan Academy Prize for A Last Note, having been diagnosed with terminal liver cancer during its production. Half of her ashes are scattered on the island of Sukune in Mihara, Hiroshima, where The Naked Island was filmed.

Filmography

Film

 Shojoho (1950)
 Miyagi Hiroba (1951)
 Arabiya monogatari (1951)
 Tsuki no wataridori (1951) – Oichi
 Dare ga watashi o sabaku no ka (1951)
 Miss Oyu (1951) – Shizu
 Meigetsu somato (1951)
 Story of a Beloved Wife (1951) – Takako Ishikawa
 The Tale of Genji (1951) – Murasaki no ue
 Izayoi kaido (1951)
 Asakusa kurenaidan (1952) – Maki Ayukawa
 Avalanche (1952) – Atsuko Fujikawa
 Atakake no hitobito (1952)
 Children of Hiroshima (1952) – Takako Ishikawa
 Kantarou tsukiyo-uta (1952) – Okyo
 Senba zuru (1953) – Ayako Ohta
 Onna to iu shiro – Mari no maki (1953)
 Onna to iu shiro – Yuko no maki (1953)
 Hatamoto Taikutsu Otoko 808 Chome (1953)
 Mura hatibu (1953)
 Epitome (1953) – Ginko
 Yokubo (1953) – Shizue Kitami
 Yoake mae (1953) – Hanzo's Daughter
 Life of a Woman (1953) – Fujiko Shirakawa
 Koina no Ginpei (1954) – Oichi
 Utsukushī hito (1954)
 An Inn at Osaka (1954) – Uwabami
 Dobu (1954) – Tsuru
 Dorodarake no seishun (1954) – Nanako
 Ai to shi no tanima (1954)
 Wakai hitotachi (1954)
 Aisureba koso (1955) – Michie (segment 1)
 Ginza no onna (1955)
 Wolf (1955) – Akiko Yano
 Kabuki juhachiban: Narukami – Bijo to kairyu (1955)
 Shirogane Shinjū (1956) – Sakie / Umeko
 Ruri no kishi (1956) – Hagiyo, Chiho's mother
 Shin ono ga tsumi (1956)
 Yoake Asaake (1956)
 An Actress (1956) – Kakuko Mori
 Aru yo futatabi (1956)
 Kottaisan yori: Nyotai wa kanashiku (1957) – Tamasode
 Hadairo no tsuki (1957) – Kumiko Uno
 Ukifune (1957) – Naka-no-kimi
 Yagyū bugeichō: Sōryū hiken (1958) – the Princess
 Makeraremasen katsumadewa (1958) – Odama
 Kanashimi wa onna dakeni (1958) – Taka
 A Holiday in Tokyo (1958) – Nobuko
 Yajikita Dochuuki (1958)
 Noren (1958)
 Tsuzurikata kyodai (1958) – Aunt
 Mimizuku (1958)
 Nora neko (1958)
 Yajikita dōchū sugoroku (1958) – Ofutsu / maid
 Hana noren (1959)
 Lucky Dragon No. 5 (1959) – Shizu Kuboyama
 Aisaiki (1959)
 Okaasan no yume (僕らの母さん) (1959)
 Kashima ari (1959)
 Ai no kane (1959)
 The Three Treasures (1959) – Goddess of Anenouzume
 Hanayome-san wa sekai-ichi (1959)
 Waga ai (1960) – Hideya
 Tenka no Odorobo Shiranami Gonin Man (1960)
 Chinpindō shujin (1960)
 Onna no saka (1960)
 Shin jōdaigaku (1960)
 Bokutō kitan (1960) – Kyōko Yamai
 The Approach of Autumn (1960) – Shigeko Fukatani – Hideo's Mother
 The Naked Island (1960) – Toyo, the mother
 Hunting Rifle (1961) – Choko's mother
 Mozu (1961)
 Tōkyō yawa (1961) – Yukari
 Kojin koujitsu (1961)
 Netsuai sha (1961) – Tamiko
 Immortal Love (1961) – Tomoko, Takashi's wife
 Gen to fudō myō-ō (1961)
 The Last War (1961) – Oyoshi Tamura
 Awamori-kun Kanpai (1961)
 Aijo no keifu (1961)
 Neko to katsuobushi (1961)
 Ashita aru kagiri (1962)
 Nagashi hina (1962)
 Long Way to Okinawa (1962)
 Ika naru hoshi no moto ni (1962) – Mitoji
 Sei Kurabe (1962)
 Aobeka monogatari (1962) – Kimino
 Ningen (1962) – Gorosuke
 Kawa no hotori de (1962) – Tamako Sekiguchi
 Kigeki ekimae hanten (1962)
 Yushu Heiya (1963) 
 Kanojo ni mukatte tosshinsayo (1963)
 Uso (1963) – (segment "San jyotai")
 Shiro to kuro (1963) – Ochiai's Wife
 Daidokoro taiheiki (1963)
 Wanpaku tenshi (1963)
 Hyakumannin no musumetachi (1963)
 Miren (1963) – Hatsu Kakinuma
 Mother (1963) – Tamiko
 Wakai nakamatachi: uchira Gion no maikohan (1963)
 Kigeki ekimae okami (1964) – Kyōko Yamamoto
 Kigeki yōki-na mibōjin (1964) – Kume Tanabe
 The Scent of Incense (Kōge – Nibu: Mitsumata no shō/Ichibu: Waremokō no shō) (1964) – Ikuyo
 Okaasan no baka (1964)
 Kigeki ekimae kaidan (1964)
 Onibaba (1964) – Kichi's Mother
 Daikon to ninjin (1965) – Nobuyo Yamaki
 Nami kage (1965) – Masa, Kichitaro's wife
 Kigeki ekimae kin'yū (1965)
 Daiku taiheki (1965)
 Akuto (1965) – Jiju
 Abare Gōemon (1966) – Osasa
 Kigeki ekimae benten (1966)
 Lost Sex (1966) – The Housemaid
 Akogare (1966)
 Kigeki ekimae keiba (1966)
 Danshun (1966)
 Kigeki ekimae mangan (1967)
 Izu no odoriko (1967)
 Kigeki ekimae gakuen (1967)
 Zoku Na mo naku mazushiku utsukushiku: Chichi to ko (1967) – Taeko Sakai
 Sei no kigen (1967) – Wife
 Kigeki ekimae hyakku-nen (1967)
 Kuroneko (1968) – Yone (Mother)
 Tsuyomushi onna to yowamushi otoko (1968) – Fumiko
 Āh himeyuri no tō (1968) – Hatsu Yonamine
 Machi ni izumi ga atta (1968) – Toki Yano
 Red Lion (1969) – Oharu
 Heat Wave Island (1969) – Otoyo
 Shokkaku (1970) – Tamiko / Prostitute Yuki
 Live Today, Die Tomorrow! (1970) – Take Yamada
 The Ceremony (1971) – Sakurada Shizu
 Kanawa (1972) – Middle aged woman
 Sanka (1972) – Teru Kamozawa
 The Heart (1973) – Mrs. M
 Kōkotsu no hito (1973) – Kyōko
 Shiawase (1974)
 Waga michi (1974) – Mino Kawamura
 Kenji Mizoguchi: The Life of a Film Director (documentary) (1975) – Herself
 Kyukei no Koya (1975)
 The Life of Chikuzan (1977)
 The Incident (1978)
 The Strangling (1979) – Ryoko, Mother
 Haitatsu sarenai santsu no tegami (1979) – Sumie, Mitsumasa's wife
 Kangofu no oyaji ganbaru (1980)
 Omoeba tōkue kitamonda (1980)
 Asshii-tachi no machi (1981) – Haru Hayasaka
 Ore to aitsu no monogatari (1981)
 Edo Porn (1981) – Omomo, Sashichi's Wife
 Ekisutora (1982) – Kinuyo Adachi
 Mikan no taikyoku (1982)
 The Go Masters (1983)
 The Horizon (1984) – Hideyo, after age 40
 Location (1984) – Katsue
 Tengoku ni ichiban chikai shima (1984) – Tei Ishikawa
 Shiroi machi hiroshima (1985)
 Yasha (1985) – Ume
 Lost in the Wilderness (1986) – Yasuko Muto
 Burakkubōdo (1986) – Namie Yasui
 Tree Without Leaves (1986) – Mother
 Nijushi no hitomi (1987) – Okami
 Sakura-tai Chiru (1988) – Narration
 Yumemi-dōri no hitobito (1989)
 Donmai (1990) – Toyo Murakami
 Pachinko monogatari (1990)
 Bokuto kidan (1992) – Masa
 Tsuribaka nisshi 5 (1992) – Densuke's mother
 A Last Note (1995) – Toyoko Yanagawa
 By Player (2000) – herself

Television (selection)

 Tadaima (1964–1967)
 Taikōki (1965) – Oetsu
 Saigo no jigazō (1977)
 Yokomizo Seishi Shirīzu (1977–1978)
 Nagisa no onna (1980)
 Kazunomiya sama otome (1981)
 Oshin (1983–1984) – Oshin
 Shinju yoi goshin (1984)
 The Asami Mitsuhiko Mystery (1987–1990)
 Ōinaru gen'ei (1989)
 Haha: Inochi yomigaeru hi (1992)
 Asahina Shūhei misuterī 3: Tangoji satsujin jiken (1992)
 Ude ni oboe ari (1992–1993)

Awards and honors
Japan Academy Prize
 1996: Best Supporting Actress, A Last Note

Blue Ribbon Awards
 1966: Best Supporting Actress, Lost Sex
 1953: Best Actress, Epitome, Life of a Woman and Yokubo

Kinema Junpo Awards
 1996: Best Supporting Actress, A Last Note

Mainichi Film Awards
 1996: Lifetime Achievement Award
 1993: Best Supporting Actress, The Strange Story of Oyuki
 1968: Best Actress, Operation Negligee and Kuroneko

36th Venice International Film Festival
 1979: Pasinetti Award (Best Actress), The Strangling

References

External links

 
 
 

1924 births
1994 deaths
Japanese film actresses
Asadora lead actors
Actors from Tottori Prefecture
Deaths from liver cancer
20th-century Japanese actresses
Recipients of the Medal with Purple Ribbon
People from Yonago, Tottori